Binyamin Balanero was an Israeli footballer.

Honours
Israeli Second Division
Runner-up (1): 1963-64

References

Israeli Jews
1942 births
2010 deaths
Jewish footballers
Israeli footballers
Hapoel Hadera F.C. players
Beitar Tel Aviv F.C. players
National Soccer League (Australia) players
Expatriate soccer players in Australia
Expatriate soccer players in South Africa
Israeli expatriate sportspeople in Australia
Israeli expatriate sportspeople in South Africa
Association football forwards
Israel international footballers
Transnistrian people